Teatro Instabile de Venexia is a musical street theater in gondolas with facade projections. It was founded in 2011 in Venice as "Tour de Scherxi" making part of the Carnival events official program. Artistic director and founder of Theater is Sergey Nikitin, European urban historian and activist.
A show combines a trip in a gondola and a walking tour. 
The opera performances are staged in the gondolas as singers, musicians and spectators move along the channels. The architecture of Venice creates the operas scenography. Teatro Instabile productions are inspired by works of Rossini, Mozart and Ballets Russes of Sergey Diaghilev.
For each carnival, the theater presents a new opera. In 2013 Teatro premiered “El Culo de Venexia”, the embodiment of the spirit of Venice, telling the story of a Venetian captain of Renaissance times rising from the dead. A mix of real history of the Republic (Ottoman–Venetian Wars, the real Marco Antonio Bragadin, Captain-General of Famagusta in Cyprus) and emblematic literary characters (Otello, Iago). Anecdotes, jokes, fantasies,  absurdism, improvisations, playful eroticism – it is a dithyramb to Venice: truthiness and joie de vivre of la Serenissima".
Masks and costumes are created by young artists and architects, last two times by Dasha Serebriakova.

References

Culture in Venice
Street theatre